The Feather Fairy is a 1985 film adaptation of a Brothers Grimm's "Mother Hulda" short story directed by Slovak director Juraj Jakubisko. A fairy tale about an immortal woman who cares for snow and a boy who isn't afraid of death.

Synopsis
A fairy tale not only for children about Jacob, who through his courage, manages to trick death. The film plays with people's never-ending desire for happiness, love and victory over death. Mrs Winter, The Feather Fairy, rules the world and also, being so open-hearted, raises little Jacob, who almost died in an avalanche. Life in the fairytale is perfect: the little boy is immortal, he doesn't get older, and he has everything. Even though his life is perfect, he watches human life through a looking glass. He sees a young girl Alžbetka growing into a young lady, and he desires to be a normal person and live with his love. Jakubisko: “What you do now with the special digital effects we did without them. My friend Federico Fellini persuaded Giulietta Masina to be the Feather Fairy and she brought a spark and lightness to the story.”

Film Awards
  Zlín Film Festival 1986  • Special Jury Prize 
  Slovakian Film Medal 1986
  XXIV. Festival of Czech and Slovakian Film 1986  • Prize for art production
  IV. Film Festival for youth Lyon 1986  • Young Audience Member's Prize for best film
 UNICEF Grand Prix, 1986
  Film Festival in Belgrade 1986  • Audience Prize for best film 
  XLII.Venice Film Festival 1986  • Catholic Prize
  Venice Film Festival 1986  • Certificate of Merit RAI II
  Gijón International Film Festival 1986  • Jury Prize for the best special effects 
  International Film Festival Rimouski 1988  • Grand Prize Camerio
  I. International Film Festival for children Buenos Aires 1988  • Grand Prize

Premiere screening
1 November 1985

External links
About The Feather Fairy

1985 films
Films based on Grimms' Fairy Tales
Slovak fantasy films
Films directed by Juraj Jakubisko
Films scored by Petr Hapka
1985 fantasy films
Films based on fairy tales